Over the Moon is a 2020 computer-animated musical fantasy film directed by Glen Keane and co-directed by John Kahrs, from a screenplay by Audrey Wells with additional screenplay material by Alice Wu and Jennifer Yee McDevitt. The film was produced by Pearl Studio and Netflix Animation, and animated by Sony Pictures Imageworks. It stars the voices of Cathy Ang, Phillipa Soo, Ken Jeong, John Cho, Ruthie Ann Miles, Margaret Cho, and Sandra Oh. The plot follows an adventurous girl named Fei Fei, who builds a rocket ship to meet a mythical goddess on the moon.

Over the Moon was first shown at the Montclair Film Festival on October 17, 2020, followed by its Netflix and select theaters release on October 23. The film grossed $860,000 worldwide; it earned a Golden Globe nomination for Best Animated Feature Film, and was nominated for Best Animated Feature at the 93rd Academy Awards. It is the final film that Wells worked on before her death, and it was dedicated to her memory.

Plot 
A girl named Fei Fei is being told the legend of the Moon goddess Chang'e who took a potion for immortality, causing her to become a goddess and ascend to the Moon without her lover Houyi, and awaits for him there. In preparation for the annual Moon Festival, Fei Fei and her family make mooncakes for the village. However, Fei Fei's mother falls ill, and gives her daughter a white rabbit named Bungee before passing away.

Fei Fei, who still believes in Chang'e four years later, is upset when she learns that her father is engaged to Ms. Zhong, and is annoyed by her son, Chin. Fei Fei's family joins them for the Moon Festival celebration, and she remembers her mother. Inspired by a crane and the legend of Chang'e, she decides to build a rocket to the Moon to prove that Chang'e is real. She designs a rocket that resembles a Chinese paper lantern in the shape of a rabbit that uses fireworks to boost her speed. Her rocket almost succeeds until she realizes that Chin snuck aboard her rocket and they begin to crash to Earth. Suddenly, the rocket is captured in a mystical beam of energy and taken to the Moon. They crash-land after being beset by 2 friendly foo dogs, who then rescue them and take them to Lunaria.

They are introduced to Chang'e and her backup dancers, the Lunettes. Chang'e tells Fei Fei that she was supposed to deliver a gift for Chang'e to bring Houyi back. Fei Fei takes a photo with Chang'e to prove she is real, but Chang'e takes the photo from Fei Fei and demands the gift. Fei Fei doesn't know what she is talking about, and a frustrated Chang'e announces a competition to find her gift before the last of the moondust falls. Fei Fei gets upset with Chin and leaves him, getting a ride with the Biker Chicks to the crash site. Chin sees some Lunettes with the photo and is captured by Chang'e who demands the location of the gift. Chang'e challenges Chin to a game of ping pong to learn the location of the gift, but Chin wins, further upsetting Chang'e. Chang'e cries in despair that she will never see Houyi again. While Chin is trapped in a chamber by Chang'e, Bungee follows the Jade Rabbit into his workplace. Meanwhile, Fei Fei and the Biker Chicks head to her rocket's crash site, where the former meets an exiled Lunarian named Gobi. She discovers her Chang'e doll, which she suspects to be the gift, but the Biker Chicks snatch the doll and leave Fei Fei and Gobi behind.

Fei Fei and Gobi head to Lunaria on the backs of giant toads, where Gobi reveals that Chang'e exiled him due to a song about moving on. Fei Fei and Gobi catch up to the Biker Chicks, but during their scuffle, the doll is destroyed. However, Fei Fei discovers in one of her mooncakes a broken half of an open jade circle and realizes that it is Chang'e's gift. They return to Lunaria's palace, rejoin Chin and Bungee, and present the gift to Chang'e, who makes a full jade circle. Chang'e and Houyi are then briefly reunited, but Houyi tells Chang'e to move on before fading away. Refusing to accept this, Chang'e slips into a state of depression, causing all the light in Lunaria to extinguish.

Fei Fei tries to reach out to Chang'e, but the moment she enters Chang'e's state of sadness, she also becomes depressed due to a vision of her mother. Realizing that they both must move on from their tragedies, Chang'e and Fei Fei encourage each other to find the love all around them. This allows the two to accept their loved ones' deaths, restoring light to Lunaria.

Chang'e thanks Fei Fei and allows her and Chin passage back home—excluding Bungee, who stays on the Moon with Jade Rabbit—and lifts Gobi's banishment. Fei Fei and Chin bid farewell to the Lunarians and return home, where Fei Fei accepts her father and Mrs. Zhong's marriage and Chin as her brother. About a year later, Fei Fei is living happily with her new family and continues to look up at the Moon, watching as cranes fly up towards it in the night.

Voice cast 
 Cathy Ang as Fei Fei, the 13-year-old girl who believes in Chang'e ever since the loss of her mother.
 Robert G. Chiu as Chin, Mrs. Zhong's 8-year-old son and Fei Fei's stepbrother.
 Phillipa Soo as Chang'e, the mythical Moon goddess who yearns to be with her true love Houyi again. The outfits worn by Chang'e in the film were designed and created by haute couture Chinese designer Guo Pei.
 Ken Jeong as Gobi, a pangolin Lunarian and former royal advisor who was exiled a thousand years ago.
 John Cho as Ba Ba, Fei Fei's father.
 Ruthie Ann Miles as Ma Ma, Fei Fei's late mother.
 Sandra Oh as Mrs. Zhong, Ba Ba's new fiancée, later wife and Fei Fei's stepmother.
 Margaret Cho as Auntie Ling, one of Fei Fei's aunts.
 Cho also voices Gretch, one of the Biker Chicks.
 Kimiko Glenn as Auntie Mei, another one of Fei Fei's aunts.
 Glenn also voices Lulu, one of the Biker Chicks.
 Artt Butler as Uncle, Fei Fei's uncle.
 Butler also voices Bill, one of the Biker Chicks.
 Irene Tsu as Grandma, Fei Fei's grandma.
 Clem Cheung as Grandpa, Fei Fei's grandpa.
 Conrad Ricamora as Hou Yi, Chang’e's true love

Soundtrack 
The score was composed by Steven Price and recorded at Synchron Stage Vienna. Original songs were written by Christopher Curtis, Marjorie Duffield and Helen Park.

Tracklist

Production 
On September 26, 2017, Pearl Studio hired Audrey Wells to write the script for the film called Over the Moon, which was based on an idea by Janet Yang about a retelling of the classic Chinese myth. On February 6, 2018, Netflix acquired distribution rights to the film and Glen Keane was set to direct. However, during this, Audrey Wells died in 2018. The film was dedicated in Audrey Wells' memory.

While studios like Disney and Pixar have become known to use groups of people known as the Braintrust and Story Trust to help with the script, Keane said that "Creative decisions here aren’t made by committee".

The city of Lunaria was inspired by the cover of Pink Floyd's album The Dark Side of the Moon and the paintings of Joan Miró.

Animation was provided by Pearl Studio and Sony Pictures Imageworks.

Steven Price is confirmed to be the film's composer while new original songs are being handled by Christopher Curtis (from Chaplin: The Musical), Marjorie Duffield and Helen Park (from KPOP the Musical).

The cast was announced in June 2020.

Release 
The film was released in select theaters and on Netflix on October 23, 2020. Prior to its October 23 debut, Over the Moon was shown at the Montclair Film Festival on October 17. A day before its release, a book written by animation historian Leonard Maltin about the history about the film called Over the Moon: Illuminating the Journey, was released on October 22. In January 2021, Netflix reported 43 million households had watched the film.

Reception 
 The website's critics consensus reads: "Although many of Over the Moons narrative ingredients will seem familiar, the film's absorbing animation offers colorful compensation." 

Peter Debruge of Variety wrote: "Sometimes it's OK for an adventure to be just an adventure, and this one gets in the way of its own assets, while pointing to the potential of future journeys from the Netflix animation team."

Accolades

References

External links 
 
 
 Original screenplay by Audrey Wells

2020 films
2020 computer-animated films
2020 fantasy films
2020s musical films
2020s musical comedy-drama films
American musical drama films
2020s children's animated films
American children's animated comedy films
American children's animated drama films
American children's animated fantasy films
American children's animated musical films
Animated musical films
American comedy-drama films
Animated drama films
Animated coming-of-age films
Chinese animated films
Children's comedy-drama films
2020s English-language films
Films directed by Glen Keane
Films scored by Steven Price
Films with screenplays by Audrey Wells
Films set in China
Moon in film
American musical fantasy films
Netflix Animation films
English-language Chinese films
English-language Netflix original films
Films about grieving
Films set in outer space
2020s American films